"Infra-Red" is a song by English alternative rock band Placebo, released on 19 June 2006 as the third single from their fifth studio album Meds.

Release
The song peaked at number 42 in the UK, number 35 on the U.S. Modern Rock Tracks chart and number 91 in Germany. It was nominated for the Kerrang! Award for Best Single. A live version of the song is available on the Live at La Cigale EP.

Music video

The music video features businessmen apparently conspiring against the public. They observe a computer disk containing a graphic of a DNA molecule with a hazardous ligand. Meanwhile, a group of ants interfere with their computer equipment. A character, identified as a corporate executive president, gives a press conference with the help of a computerized prompter, but the ants' interference causes the prompter to say "I lied to you. We are the enemy", which the president reads.

Track listings
7-inch
 "Infra-Red"
 "Infra-Red" (Call the Ambulance Remix)

CD
 "Infra-Red"
 "Infra-Red" (Hotel Persona Remix)

Maxi CD
 "Infra-Red"
 "Infra-Red" (The Waltmann Remix)
 "Song to Say Goodbye" (River & Tears Remix)

DVD single
 "Infra-Red" (video)
 "Song to Say Goodbye" (extended video)
 Behind the scenes footage and interviews from the "Infra-Red" video shoot
 "Song to Say Goodbye" (River & Tears Remix)

Charts

References

External links
 

Placebo (band) songs
2006 singles
2006 songs
Songs written by Brian Molko
Songs written by Stefan Olsdal
Songs written by Steve Hewitt
Virgin Records singles